is a city located in Okhotsk Subprefecture, Hokkaido, Japan; on the Sea of Okhotsk. The name comes from Ainu Mopet (Quiet River), Ainu "-pet"  would be interpreted "-betsu" in Japanese as well of other city names in Hokkaido.

As of September 30, 2016, the city has an estimated population of 22,983 and a population density of 27.67 persons per km2.

Most of Monbetsu's economy is dedicated to fishing for cold-water species such as crab. The crab from Monbetsu is reputedly the best in Japan, and is such a source of town pride that a sculpture of a crab claw nearly 10 m tall was built on the waterfront.

History
1889: Village office established in Monbetsu
1909:  and Monbetsu Village merge to form Monbetsu Village
1919: Monbetsu Village becomes Monbetsu Town
July 1, 1954:  and  merge with Monbetsu to form the city of Monbetsu

Geography
Shokotsu River flows through the city.

Climate
Monbetsu has a humid continental climate (Köppen climate classification Dfb) with warm summers and cold winters. Precipitation falls throughout the year, but is heaviest from July to September.

Transportation
Monbetsu does not have passenger rail service. There are buses to Sapporo and Asahikawa, as well as a daily flight to Tokyo from Monbetsu Airport.

Shokotsu Line and Nayoro Main Line used to run in the city.

Education

High school
 Hokkaido Monbetsu High School

Sightseeing
Monbetsu is famous for drift ice, a yearly phenomenon which reaches the city every January or February from the northern Sea of Okhotsk. As such, the city has taken on the drift ice as its symbol and has become a center for research on sea ice generally, with an international conference held in February (usually the time of peak sea ice) each year. There is also a yearly Drift Ice Festival that coincides with the Sapporo Snow Festival. The festival features impressive sculptures built out of drift ice along with a large ice maze. Additionally, the Okhotsk Tower is a facility where one can observe sea ice from both high above, and from below the ocean. It is complete with an information center and aquarium. An icebreaker, the Garinko II, departs from nearby and makes regular sightseeing cruises through the drift ice during the winter. Monbetsu is also home to the Okhotsk Sea Ice Museum of Hokkaido, which covers all aspects of sea ice and features a sub-zero room and "frozen aquarium" of various fish preserved in ice.

During the summertime, when the sea ice melts, sailors from Russia are a common sight in the city. Some local businesses have banned Russian visitors for their supposed "unruly" behavior, which has led some activists to criticize Monbetsu as a hotbed of racial discrimination.

Mascot

He is a curious, festive and exciting 53-year-old harbor seal. He usually wears a happi coat with an iceberg motif, a belly band (which is his charm point as it helps him give extra warmth during the winter and extra coolness during the summer) and a scallop as a wig. As a seal, he can resist the extreme weather (both cold and hot). He sometimes wear salmon roes, crab claws and salmon as wigs. Despite his old age, he can go scuba diving. He lives in the Hokkaidoritsu Okhotsk Ryuhyo Park (which is also his workplace). He usually goes to festivals and the Port of Monbetsu. His hobbies are fishing, studying the sea and taking naps on drift ice (during the winter) and at the Okhotsk White Beach (during the summer). He likes all kinds of seafood but try to offer him some sweets and vegetables and he will refuse them for health reasons. His goal is to be a good elder when it comes to promoting the city. Whenever anyone sees him, he brings smiles.

Sister cities

Monbetsu is twinned with:
 Korsakov, Russia
 Newport, United States

Monbetsu also has friendly relations with Fairbanks in the United States.

References

External links

Official Website 

Cities in Hokkaido
Port settlements in Japan
Populated coastal places in Japan